Soul Demise is a German melodic death metal band from Neumarkt in Bavaria, founded in 1993 as Inhuman. Their musical style is mainly influenced by the Swedish band At the Gates and their Göteborg sound.

Guitarist Andreas Schuhmeier is the only founding member still with the band, which was renamed Soul Demise in 1998.

Despite several member changes Soul Demise has toured with well-known artists such as Vader (1997/98), Krisiun and Soilwork (1998), Immolation and Deströyer 666 (2001), Napalm Death (2002), Illdisposed (2002) and Dismember (2004), and have released some albums which were warmly welcomed by specialist publications.

Their fourth album, Acts of Hate, was released on 17 April 2009.

Discography 
 Incantations (demo, 1994, as Inhuman)
 Inner Fears (self released, 1996, as Inhuman)
 Farewell to the Flesh (MCD, 1998)
 Beyond Human Perception (CD/LP, 2000) through Gutter Records
 In Vain (CD, 2002) through Season of Mist
 Blind (CD, 2005) through Remedy Records
 Acts of Hate (CD, 2009) through Remission/Soulfood
 Sindustry (CD, 2010) through Remission

Sources 
 Soul Demise at metal-archives.com
 Inhuman at metal-archives.com
 Article at Whiskey-Soda.de
 Article and interview at Metal.de, 2005

External links 
 
 

German melodic death metal musical groups
Musical groups established in 1993
Season of Mist artists